Abir Hossain Angkon is a Bangladeshi film actor. He won Bangladesh National Film Award for Best Child Artist for the film Baishamya (2014).

Selected films
 Baishamya - 2014

Awards and nominations
National Film Awards

References

External links

Bangladeshi film actors
Best Child Artist National Film Award (Bangladesh) winners
Living people
Year of birth missing (living people)